Robert Gillespie (3 December 1900 – 11 August 1960) was a Scottish amateur footballer who made over 420 appearances as a centre half in the Scottish League for Queen's Park. After his retirement as a player, he served the club as secretary, committeeman and president until May 1957. Gillespie was capped by Scotland at full and amateur level and represented the Scottish League XI.

See also
List of one-club men in association football
List of Scotland national football team captains

References

External links 
 

1900 births
1960 deaths
Association football wing halves
Scottish footballers
Scotland international footballers
Scottish Junior Football Association players
Queen's Park F.C. players
Scottish Football League players
People from Cathcart
Scottish Football League representative players
Scotland amateur international footballers
Footballers from Glasgow
Queen's Park F.C. non-playing staff